Penicillium brevistipitatum is a fungus species of the genus of Penicillium which was isolated from the Jilin Province in China.

See also
List of Penicillium species

References

brevistipitatum